Robert Presslie (1920—2000) was a British science fiction author active in the late 1950s and early 1960s.

Bibliography

Novels
Old MacDonald (1958)

Short stories
"A Star Called Tommy" (1955)
"Trespassers Will Be Prosecuted" (1955)
"Cat up a Tree" (1956)
"The Creep" (1956)
"Lest We Forget" (1956)
"Post Mortem" (1956)
"Flesh and Blood" (1956)
"Pilgrims All" (1956)
"Chip on My Shoulder" (1957)
"Comeback" (1957)
"Copy Cat" (1957)
"Interrupted View" (1957)
"My Name Is Macnamara" (1957)
"Plague" (1957)
"Star Tober" (1957)
"Trojan Horse" (1957)
"Another Word for Man" (1958)
"The Champ" (1958)
"Dial 'O' for Operator" (1958)
"The 40th of December" (1958)
"Ladies' Man" (1958)
"Next of Kin" (1958)
"One for the Road" (1958)
"Pariah" (1958)
"Sendoff" (1958)
"Take Your Partners" (1958)
"Verdict" (1958)
"Confession Is Good" (1959)
"The Savage One" (1959)
"Suicide Squad" (1959)
"Lucky Dog" (1962)
"One Foot in the Door" (1962)
"Remould" (1962)
"Dipso Facto" (1963)
"Ecdysiac" (1963)
"No Brother of Mine" (1963)
"Till Life Do Us Part" (1963)
"The Day Before Never" (1965)
"The Night of the Seventh Finger" (1966)

Nonfiction
"Speaking for Myself" (1963)

General references

1920 births
2000 deaths
English science fiction writers
20th-century British novelists